The 2014 Bannu Bombing was a bombing attack by the Taliban that killed twenty six Pakistani soldiers. Thirty-eight other people were injured as a result of the bombing.

History
The bomb was first placed in an eighteen-seater van. The bomb then hit an army convoy which killed many Pakistani soldiers. The vehicle where many of the soldiers were was being rented by the Frontier Corps. The vehicle was traveling to Razmak, in North Waziristan. The bomb exploded at an army checkpoint. Fifteen of the twenty security officers that were injured were taken to the Bannu Combined Military Hospital in critical condition.

Reaction
According to  TTP spokesman Shahidullah Shahid, "The bombing was carried out to (avenge) the killing of Maulana Waliur Rehman, commander of TTP South Waziristan, who was killed on May 29, 2013, in a U.S. drone strike in Miranshah." The Prime Minister of Pakistan, Nawaz Sharif, canceled a trip to Davos, Switzerland that he had planned.

Retaliation
As a result of the bombing, helicopters operated by the Pakistan Army fired missiles, resulting in the deaths of three militants and two children. The helicopters fired at a road in the village of Musaki.

References

21st-century mass murder in Pakistan
Attacks in Pakistan in 2014
Bannu District
Islamic terrorist incidents in 2014
Terrorist incidents in Pakistan in 2014
Mass murder in 2014
Car and truck bombings in Pakistan
Massacres in Pakistan
Crime in Khyber Pakhtunkhwa
Tehrik-i-Taliban Pakistan attacks